Maurice O'Shea (27 December 1879 – 14 August 1911) was an Irish hurler who played as a forward with the Cork senior hurling team. He was an All-Ireland Championship winner in 1902.

Career

O'Shea began his hurling career at club level with Dungourney in East Cork. He played at a time when the club enjoyed its most successful era ever and won Cork Senior Championship titles in 1902, 1907 and 1909.

At inter-county level, O'Shea first played for the Cork senior hurling team on 9 August 1903 in what was the delayed 1902 championship. After missing Cork's Munster Championship triumph, he later won an All-Ireland Championship medal after a 3-13 to no score defeat of London at the Cork Athletic Grounds. O'Shea later lined with Cork on a number of occasions before playing his last game on 29 August 1909.

O'Shea died in a drowning accident at Lough Carrig Bay in Cork Harbour on 14 August 1911.

Honours

Dungourney
Cork Senior Hurling Championship (3): 1902, 1907, 1909

Cork
All-Ireland Senior Hurling Championship (1): 1902

References

1879 births
1911 deaths
Dungourney hurlers
Cork inter-county hurlers
All-Ireland Senior Hurling Championship winners